Die Skeptiker (English: The Skeptics) is a German punk band, founded in 1986 in East Berlin.

Die Skeptiker were part of the so-called Die anderen Bands (the other bands in accordance to the mainstream bands in East Germany) which played political lyrics that criticised life in the GDR.

In 2000, their singer, Eugen Balanskat, founded Roter Mohn (later renamed to Rotorfon) playing punk rock cover versions of 1920s - 1940s songs. The band reformed in 2006 to mark their 20th anniversary. Since then, the band has toured throughout Germany.

Discography
 O.T. (MC, 1988)
 Schreie (MC, 1989)
 Die Skeptiker (AMIGA Quartet, e.g. 7" with four tracks, 1989)
 Harte Zeiten (1990)
 Sauerei (1991)
 Schwarze Boten (1993)
 Live (1994)
 Stahlvogelkrieger (1995)
 Frühe Werke (compilation album with old tracks from the 1980s, 1996)
 Wehr Dich! (1998)
 DaDa in Berlin - Tondokumente 2007 (2007)
 Fressen und Moral (2009)
 Aufsteh'n (2013)
 Kein Weg Zu Weit (2018)

External links
 Die Skeptiker - official site (German)
 Rotorfon - official site of the other band of Eugen Balanskat (German)
 Die Anderen Bands (The Other Bands) - Skeptiker discography
 Skeptiker interview at www.sallys.net (German)

German punk rock groups
Musical groups established in 1986
Musical groups from Berlin
1986 establishments in East Germany
East German musical groups